Ria or RIA may refer to:

 Ria, a landform, often referred to as a drowned river valley
 Ria (given name), a short form of Maria

Media
 Astro Ria Malaysian pay-TV channel 104
 Ria 89.7FM, a Singaporean radio station
 RIA Novosti
 RIA, formerly Research Institute of America, an American publisher on tax and regulatory matters owned by Thomson Reuters

Sciences
 Radioimmunoassay
 Rare Isotope Accelerator
 Research into Ageing

Technology
 RateItAll, a review website
 Rich Internet Application
 Robotic Industries Association
 Rock Island Armory
IATA-Code of Santa Maria Airport

Others
 Registered investment advisor
 Regulatory impact analysis
 Rhoose Cardiff International Airport railway station, Wales
 Ria (singer), New Zealand singer
 RIA (restaurant)
 Rock Island Arsenal
 Royal Irish Academy
 Ria Money Transfer
 Railway Industry Association